Gnoli is a surname of Italian origin. Notable people with the surname include:

 Domenico Gnoli (author) (1839–1915), Italian author
 Domenico Gnoli (painter) (1933–1970), Italian painter and stage designer
 Raniero Gnoli (born 1930), Italian Orientalist and historian

Surnames of Italian origin